Kathi may refer to:

 a short form of Kathleen (disambiguation)
 Kathi caste, a Darbar caste of Saurashtra in Gujarat, India
 a former small princely state part of the Mewas States in the former district of Khandesh, Maharashtra, India
 Kathi (film), a 1983 Indian film
 Kati roll or kathi roll, an Indian street food

See also
 Cathie
 Cathy
 Kathie
 Kathy
 Kati (disambiguation)
 Katie
 Katy (disambiguation)